James House is the self-titled debut studio album by American country music artist James House. It was released in 1989 via MCA Records. Although the album did not chart, its single "Don't Quit Me Now" peaked at No. 25 on Hot Country Songs.

Critical reception
Jack Hurst of The Chicago Tribune gave the album three stars out of four, saying that "Most of this record is very rhythmic, with lyrics tending toward the simple but eloquent."

Track listing

Personnel
As listed on Discogs.
 Richard Bennett — acoustic guitar
 Chris Camp — electric guitar
 Paul Franklin — steel guitar, Pedabro
 Vince Gill — background vocals
 Glen D. Hardin — piano
 James House — lead vocals, background vocals, acoustic guitar
 David Hungate — bass guitar
 Mac McAnally — background vocals
 Steuart Smith — electric guitar
 Harry Stinson — drums, background vocals

References

1989 debut albums
MCA Records albums
James House (singer) albums
Albums produced by Tony Brown (record producer)